Armando "Chato" Robles (born 9 January 1978) is a Mexican professional boxer. He twice held the WBC FECARBOX light welterweight title.

Professional career

Mexican Light Welterweight title
In March 2010, he beat an undefeated Javier Arostegui by knockout to win the Mexican National light welterweight title.

On November 27, 2010, Robles beat  Daniel Sandoval in Tijuana, Baja California.

References

External links

Sportspeople from Guadalajara, Jalisco
Boxers from Jalisco
Welterweight boxers
1978 births
Living people
Mexican male boxers